Liu Chuan-chung ( 5 April 1942 – 5 July 2016) was a Taiwanese politician.

Political career
Liu was active in multiple Taichung-based agricultural associations and businesses. He served on the Taichung County Council and Taiwan Provincial Council before running in the 1998 legislative elections. Liu served four consecutive terms on the Legislative Yuan, stepping down in 2012.

His health deteriorated in later life, as he suffered a stroke and underwent amputation due to complications of diabetes. Liu died at the age of 74 in 2016.

References

1942 births
2016 deaths
Taichung Members of the Legislative Yuan
Members of the 4th Legislative Yuan
Members of the 5th Legislative Yuan
Members of the 6th Legislative Yuan
Members of the 7th Legislative Yuan
Kuomintang Members of the Legislative Yuan in Taiwan
Businesspeople from Taichung
Taichung City Councilors